Adele Ferguson  is an Australian investigative journalist, best known for her series of exposés of malfeasance in the franchising, aged care, and financial services sectors in Australia which have resulted in major inquiries including the Hayne Royal Commission.

Career
After graduating from the University of Adelaide with degrees in economics and arts, Ferguson began a cadetship at The Advertiser newspaper. She then worked at Business Review Weekly magazine as senior business correspondent, and as business writer for The Australian newspaper. In 2009, she joined Fairfax Media as senior business writer and columnist for The Sydney Morning Herald and The Age.

In July 2012, Ferguson released Gina Rinehart: The Untold Story of the Richest Woman in the World, an unauthorised biography of mining magnate Gina Rinehart. Rinehart's lawyers issued a subpoena for Ferguson to produce source material relating to Rinehart's son, John Hancock. The subpoena was dismissed by the Supreme Court of Western Australia, with Rinehart ordered to pay Ferguson's legal costs.

Since 2014, Ferguson has worked on several joint investigations with the ABC's Four Corners program. The first, "Banking Bad", described "unconscionable banking practices" in the Commonwealth Bank and other Australian banks, and won the Gold Walkley award. Subsequent collaborations alleged wage fraud in the 7-Eleven, Domino's Pizza, Retail Food Group and Caltex franchises.

For her work in exposing corporate governance malpractices in the financial sector, the Institute of Certified Management Accountants, Australia inducted Ferguson to the Global Management Accounting Hall of Fame  in 2019.

Awards and honours
In 2014, Ferguson (along with ABC collaborators Deb Masters and Mario Christodoulou) won the Gold Walkley award for their story "Banking Bad" about the financial planning and advice services of the Commonwealth Bank.

Also in 2014, Ferguson won Journalist of the Year at the Kennedy Awards.

Ferguson was made a Member of the Order of Australia in the 2019 Australia Day Honours, for significant service to the print and broadcast media as a journalist and business commentator.

Banking Bad was shortlisted for the 2020 Davitt Award for best nonfiction crime book and best debut crime book.

Publications

References

External links

Year of birth missing (living people)
Living people
Australian business and financial journalists
Australian women journalists
University of Adelaide alumni
Walkley Award winners
Members of the Order of Australia
21st-century Australian women writers
21st-century Australian writers